The Hamming scheme, named after Richard Hamming, is also known as the hyper-cubic association scheme, and it is the most important example for coding theory.

Recall that an association scheme is visualized as a complete graph with labeled edges. In particular, each vertex is incident with exactly  edges labeled ;  is the valency of the relation  The  in a Hamming scheme are given by

References

Coding theory